Helena is one of the four fictional young lovers – the others being Demetrius, Lysander, Hermia – featured in William Shakespeare's iconic play A Midsummer Night's Dream.

Role in A Midsummer Night's Dream 
Helena, the daughter of Nedar, is the lifelong friend of Hermia (to whom she often compares herself). Before the events of the play, Helena was betrothed to the nobleman Demetrius, but she was jilted when his affections turned to Hermia. Despite this, Helena's abiding love for Demetrius remains consistent throughout the play. Hermia and her suitor, Lysander, confide in Helena that they plan to elope. In the hopes that she will gain back some of Demetrius' respect, Helena tells him of Hermia and Lysander's plans, and they follow the escaping lovers into the forest.

Though Demetrius is deliberately cruel towards her, Helena remains true to her devotion. Her ardor catches the attention of Oberon, who commands that Puck enchant Demetrius so that he will fall back in love with Helena. When Puck mistakenly enchants a sleeping Lysander instead, Lysander wakes and falls instantly in love with Helena. He pursues a shocked and hurt Helena, deserting a sleeping Hermia. Oberon, trying to correct Puck's error, then puts the potion on Demetrius, who also falls in love with Helena. Helena is left confused and hurt by how cruel and unkind her closest friend and her two suitors have become. In the climatic fight, she and Hermia nearly come to blows while the two men fight over who is more worthy of Helena's affections.

Oberon commands Puck to correct the enchantment placed on Lysander. Separated by Oberon's command and Puck's magic, and with dawn approaching, the lovers each go to sleep again. Puck crushes another herb into Lysander's eyes, negating the effect of the first one. When the lovers are discovered in the morning by a hunting Theseus, Hippolyta, and Egeus, all is put right. Demetrius claims that a metaphorical 'sickness' made him love Hermia, but in health, his love has returned to Helena. The lovers are married in a joint ceremony with Theseus and Hippolyta, and together watch the play put on by the Mechanicals in honor of the marriages.

While not the only protagonist of A Midsummer Night's Dream, Helena is one of its most talkative characters. Her dialogue provides key insight for the audience into humanist beliefs on the nature of love and the process of falling in love. It is her honest, unrequited love that convinces Oberon to meddle with the lovers, and her pain in being "tricked" by her friends that convinces Oberon to restore everyone.

Helena is never criticized for her unrequited love for Demetrius; her constancy is seen by other characters as a great virtue, compared to their fickle nature. She also demonstrates great platonic love and sisterly devotion to Hermia. Within the cast of the lovers, her role is comparable to Lysander's. Both are more outwardly romantic and thoughtful than their partners, and both speak those lines most pertinent to the play's themes of romantic maturity and the source of lasting love. While Lysander says, "the course of true love ne'er did run smooth," Helena's speech in Act I includes the well-known quote: "Love looks not with the eyes, but with the mind; And therefore, is wing'd Cupid painted blind."

Her name is reminiscent of Helen of Troy, a reference made by Theseus towards the play's end, and her character is similar to another of Shakespeare's Helenas in All's Well That Ends Well.

References

 Shakespeare, William & Gill, Roma (ed.)1981, "A Midsummer Night's Dream", Oxford University Press, United Kingdom. 
 Shakespeare, William. A Midsummer Night's Dream. "The Penguin Shakespeare." Penguin/Puffin Books, 1977.
 Jacobson, Karin. CliffsNotes on A Midsummer Night's Dream. 15 November 2010 <https://web.archive.org/web/20110613191544/http://www.cliffsnotes.com/study_guide/literature/id-78.html>.
 Shakespeare, William. A Midsummer Night's Dream. Evans, Bertrand, ed.; Lynch, James J., ed. The Merchant of Venice, A Midsummer Night's Dream. New York: The Macmillan Company, 1963. 131–238.

Literary characters introduced in 1596
Female Shakespearean characters
Characters in A Midsummer Night's Dream
Fictional Greek people
Fictional nobility